The Chicago Athenaeum is a private museum of architecture and design, based in Galena, Illinois. The museum focuses on the art of design in all areas of the discipline: architecture, industrial and product design, graphics, landscape architecture, and urban planning. Among its goals is to advance public education on how design can positively impact the human environment. The museum awards numerous prizes for architecture and design.

History
The museum was founded in 1988 in Chicago and 1998 moved to Schaumburg, Illinois and in 2004 on to Galena, Illinois. The museum in Galena is located in a former brewery building (Fulton Brewery, later Galena Brewery, Eulberg & Sons).

In Schaumburg, the museum occupied an old barn at 190 S. Roselle Rd., before the village evicted it in 2004. The Museum also maintained an International Sculpture Park with works of contemporary art. The sculpture park still exists, situated in a park behind the Prairie Center for the Arts.

Work
The museum aims to improve public knowledge and awareness on architecture and design, and how these two fields can affect human environment and the quality of life. It has held exhibitions on architecture and design in several countries, and also holds several international programs abroad. It currently maintains offices and operations in Chicago, Schaumburg, and Galena, Illinois, as well as Dublin, Ireland and Athens, Greece.

Award programs
Since 1996, the museum has organized the annual Good Design Awards. The Museum also co-organizes the American Architecture Awards, the American Prize for Architecture, the International Architecture Awards, and the Green Good Design Awards.

Management
The museum's president is Christian Narkiewicz-Laine. The vice president is Loannis Karalias who is also chief curator and director of design; the director of administration is Lary Sommers, and the director in Europe and COO is Kieran Conlon.

References

External links

 Castelli Ferrieri, Anna, Architecture and Design Anna Castelli Ferrieri - Architecture and Design Exhibition
 Karuhn Carri (May 29, 2000)  Village Gardens Await Pieces of Athenaeum Art

Art museums and galleries in Chicago
Art and design organizations
1988 establishments in Illinois
Design museums in the United States
Architecture museums in the United States